In geometry, the great triakis octahedron is the dual of the stellated truncated hexahedron (U19). It has 24 intersecting isosceles triangle faces. Part of each triangle lies within the solid, hence is invisible in solid models.

Proportions 
The dihedral angle equals .

References

External links
Mathworld - Great Triakis Octahedron
Mathworld - Small Triakis Octahedron
 Uniform polyhedra and duals

Dual uniform polyhedra